Robert Saitschick or Robert Saitschik (April 24, 1868, Mstsislau, Russian Empire – February 23, 1965, Horgen) was a Swiss philosopher.

He grew up in Warsaw, where his father Morduch Zaitchik became a merchant. After graduating from the 8th grade of the 5th Warsaw gymnasium he became a member of a revolutionary circle, which led to a legal action against him in 1887 over spreading of a revolutionary poem. He left Warsaw in late December of that year and moved to Vienna.

He was a professor at Swiss Federal Institute of Technology Zürich (1895–1914), Universität zu Köln (1914–1925).

Literary works 
 Dostojewski und Tolstoi, 1892
 Der Mensch und sein Ziel, 1914
 Von der innern Not unseres Zeitalters. Ein Ausblick auf Fausts künftigen Weg, 1917
 Die geistige Krisis der europäischen Menschheit, 1924
 Schicksal und Erlösung, 1927
 Schöpfer höchster Lebenswerte, 1945
 Der Staat und was mehr ist als er, 1946
 Bismarck und das Schicksal des deutschen Volkes. Zur Psychologie und Geschichte der deutschen Frage,  München 1949.

References

External links 
 
 

1868 births
1965 deaths
19th-century philosophers
20th-century Russian philosophers
19th-century Swiss people
19th-century Belarusian people
Swiss philosophers
German-language writers
People from Mstsislaw
Swiss people of Russian-Jewish descent
People from Horgen
Academic staff of ETH Zurich